Plaza Río Tijuana is an open-air shopping center in the Zona Río (new main business district) of Tijuana, Baja California, Mexico. It opened in 1981 as the first large American-style mall in the city; previously Downtown Tijuana was the leading shopping area. Currently, it has the anchors Soriana, Sears, and Cinépolis. There was a Dorian's department store here until 2009 when it became Sears. Comercial Mexicana was also in the mall until it became Soriana in 2018.

References

Shopping malls in Tijuana